The 2010 Valencia GP3 Series round was a GP3 Series motor race held on June 26 and June 27, 2010, at the Valencia Street Circuit in Valencia, Spain. It was the third round of the 2010 GP3 Series. The race was used to support the 2010 European Grand Prix.

Classification

Qualifying

Notes
1. - Roberto Merhi, Michael Christensen, Stefano Coletti, Alexander Rossi, Pablo Sánchez López, Dean Smith, Daniel Morad, James Jakes and Lucas Foresti received a three-place grid penalty because of ignoring yellow flags. Felipe Guimarães was penalised for crossing the pit exit line during free practice.

Feature race

Sprint race

Standings after the round

Drivers' Championship standings

Teams' Championship standings

 Note: Only the top five positions are included for both sets of standings.

See also 
 2010 European Grand Prix
 2010 Valencia GP2 Series round

References

Valencia
Valencia